Petrophyllia is a genus of corals belonging to the family Oculinidae.

The species of this genus are found in Australia and Northern America.

Species:

Petrophyllia arkensasensis 
Petrophyllia barbadiana 
Petrophyllia crassiseptata 
Petrophyllia gardnerae 
Petrophyllia niimiensis 
Petrophyllia rediviva 
Petrophyllia vernonensis

References

Oculinidae
Scleractinia genera